Trigger Warning with Killer Mike is an American documentary streaming television series on Netflix. The six-episode first season was released on January 18, 2019. The show, hosted by rapper Killer Mike, explores issues in America that affect the black community, including drugs, gangs, religion, and poverty.

Episodes

References

External links 
  on Netflix
 

Netflix original documentary television series
English-language Netflix original programming
2010s American documentary television series
2019 American television series debuts